Josef Gunnar Torhamn, born Olsson (21 December 1894 – 2 February 1965), was a Swedish painter and sculptor, particularly noted for his work on church interiors.

Biography
Torhamn was born in Konungshamn, Torhamn, Blekinge, the son of the coastal inspector Ander J. Olsson and his wife Elina (née Andersson). He showed artistic promise even in his childhood and went on to study at the Royal Academy of Arts from 1918 under Olle Hjortzberg among others. He was awarded the Academy's royal medal in 1921 and again in 1924. In 1925 he was awarded a large travel bursary and up to 1928 visited France, Italy and North Africa.

Torhamn became a noted monumental artist, especially for church decorations such as frescoes, altarpieces and crucifixes in a traditional style. The first major project of this sort, which helped establish his career, was in the Högalid Church in Stockholm, on which his former tutor Olle Hjortzberg also worked, where he created a triumphal cross in 1922–1923, and later the frescoes in the baptistry.

His prolific easel paintings covered a varied range of subjects, but he principally depicted the coastal landscapes of Blekinge as well as sacred themes. He had one-man exhibitions in Kalmar in 1934 and Malmö in 1944, among others, and participated in exhibitions at the Kulturen museum in Lund in 1929, and the Stockholm Exhibition of 1930, as well as in exhibitions of modern religious art in Eksjö in 1948 and Vetlanda in 1949. His work was part of the painting event in the art competition at the 1936 Summer Olympics.

Torhamn's work is represented in, among other repositories, the collections of the Moderna Museet in Stockholm, the Archive of Decorative Art in Lund, the Kalmar Art Museum and the Kalmar Provincial Museum.

In 1923 he married the artist Ingegerd Sjöstrand, better known as Ingegerd Torhamn, with whom he had two sons, the graphic artist Staffan Torhamn and the writer Urban Torhamn. He died in Stockholm in 1965 and is buried in Torhamn.

Gallery

References

1894 births
1965 deaths
20th-century Swedish painters
Swedish male painters
Olympic competitors in art competitions
People from Karlskrona Municipality
20th-century Swedish male artists